Jayathi Y. Murthy is an Indian-American mechanical engineer who is the current President of Oregon State University.

Previously, she was the
Ronald and Valerie Sugar Dean of the UCLA Henry Samueli School of Engineering and Applied Science at the University of California, Los Angeles where she was also a distinguished professor.  Her research interests include macroelectronics, computational fluid dynamics, heat transfer, and phase-change materials.  Murthy has served on the Engineering and Computer Science jury for the Infosys Prize since 2018.

Education and career
Murthy is the daughter of an Indian civil engineer. Originally from Hyderabad, she was a student at St. Ann's High School, Secunderabad. After graduating from the Indian Institute of Technology Kanpur, she earned a master's degree at Washington State University before completing her Ph.D. in mechanical engineering in 1984 at the University of Minnesota.

Murthy became an assistant professor of mechanical engineering at Arizona State University in 1984, but left academia in 1988 to join Fluent Inc., a computational fluid dynamics firm, where she served in various key positions including Manager, New Business Development Group and Manager, R&D. Fluent Inc. was later acquired by Ansys. She returned to academia in 1998 as an associate professor of mechanical engineering at Carnegie Mellon University, moved to Purdue University in 2001, and became Robert V. Adams Professor of Mechanical Engineering there in 2008. She moved again to the University of Texas at Austin in 2012, as department chair.

From 2008-2014, Murthy served as the director of the Center for Prediction of Reliability, Integrity and Survivability of Microsystems (PRISM), a center of excellence supported by the National Nuclear Security Administration (NNSA).

In 2016, Murthy became dean at the UCLA Samueli School of Engineering, the first woman dean in the engineering school's history. She established the UCLA Women in Engineering program (WE@UCLA), which is committed to enabling the full participation, success, and advancement of women in engineering and computer science, and is open to all students who support this mission.

As of June 7, 2022, Murthy was officially announced as the President of Oregon State University by the board of trustees. She took office September 9, 2022.

Recent research
Murthy's recent research has addressed sub-micron thermal transport, multiscale multi-physics simulations of micro- and nano-electromechanical systems (MEMS and NEMS), and the uncertainty quantifications involved in those systems.

Recognition
In 2020, Murthy was elected a member of the National Academy of Engineering "for the development of unstructured solution-adaptive finite volume methods for heat, mass, and momentum transport." She is a foreign fellow of the Indian National Academy of Engineering (INAE) and a fellow of the American Society of Mechanical Engineers (ASME).

With Brent W. Webb and Raj M. Manglik, Murthy won the ASME Heat Transfer Memorial Award in 2016, and she was the 2012 winner of the ASME K16 Clock Award for "outstanding and continuing contributions to the science and engineering of heat transfer in electronics".

Murthy is the author of more than 330 technical publications, an editor of the second edition of the Handbook of Numerical Heat Transfer, and serves on the editorial boards of Numerical Heat Transfer and the International Journal of Thermal Sciences.

References

Year of birth missing (living people)
Living people
American mechanical engineers
American women engineers
Indian mechanical engineers
Indian women engineers
IIT Kanpur alumni
Washington State University alumni
University of Minnesota College of Science and Engineering alumni
Arizona State University faculty
Carnegie Mellon University faculty
Purdue University faculty
University of Texas at Austin faculty
University of California, Los Angeles faculty
Fellows of the American Society of Mechanical Engineers
Members of the United States National Academy of Engineering